National Route 154 is a national highway of Japan connecting Minato-ku, Nagoya and Atsuta-ku, Nagoya in Japan, with a total length of 4 km (2.49 mi).

References

154
Roads in Aichi Prefecture